The Somali Institute for Peace and Justice in Minneapolis (SIPJ) was a non profit organization based in Minneapolis, Minnesota. Formed in October 2006, it advocated political unity and the institution of Islamic law in Somalia. The organization had branches in the United States, Canada and the United Kingdom. Hassan Mohamud served as the organization's President, and Abdulqadir Abdi as its Vice Chairman.

Support for the Islamic Courts Union
SIPJ issued a press release on 19 September 2006 stating "strong and unequivocal" opposition to the African Union peacekeeping force's presence in Somalia, a force that the AU deployed in response to the Islamic Courts Union's attacks on the Transitional Government. SIPJ described the deployment as needless and reckless, suggesting that the Ethiopian government used "manipulation" to control the "weak" and "subservient" Transitional Government.

At the same time the SIPJ applauded the ICU's "extraordinary achievement on bringing peace and stability" to Somalia.

In an earlier press release, released on 28 November, the SIPJ said the "Islamic Courts [Union] accomplished miracles to pacify and stabilize much of southern Somalia. Such an accomplishment must be congratulated and not be disturbed."

Core Advisory Board of SIPJ
Abdulkadir Shaair Ato
Mohamed Aden Tiiceey
Nuur Farah
Mohamed Hassan Gudbaaye
Warsame Ali Warsame
Hussein Warsame
Abdulrahman Jaahweyn
Abdulkadir Jama
Ismail Gorse
Farhan Hussein
Salah Warsame
Gandi Abdi Kadiye
Dr. Abdulkadir Dahir
Mohamud Abdulle
Afrah Abdullahi
Sh. Hassan Mohamud, J.D.
Hassan Mohamud

See also
History of the Somalis in Minneapolis–Saint Paul

References

African culture in Minnesota
Defunct organizations based in Minnesota
Islamic charities based in the United States
Charities based in Minnesota
Somali-American history
Organizations established in 2006
Organizations with year of disestablishment missing